Commandos a.k.a. Sullivan's Marauders is a 1968 Italian-produced war film filmed on Sardinia starring Lee Van Cleef and Jack Kelly and directed by Armando Crispino.

Plot 
The film is set in the middle of World War II, and in the deserts of Africa, Sgt. Sullivan (Lee Van Cleef) puts together a group of Italian-Americans into disguise as Italian soldiers in order to infiltrate a North African camp held by the Italians. Sullivan, along with Dino (Romano Puppo), was one of three that survived from the Pacific War against the Japanese, although Lieutenant Freeman was killed in his last mission. Their Captain in charge of the mission, Captain Valli (Jack Kelly), has several soldiers with special training.

Cast 
 Lee Van Cleef as Sgt. Sullivan
 Jack Kelly as Captain Valli
 Giampiero Albertini as Aldo
 Marino Masé as Italian Lt. Tomassini
 Götz George as Oberleutnant Rudi
 Pier Paolo Capponi as Corbi
 Romano Puppo as Dino
 Ivano Staccioli as Rodolfo, Radio Man
 Marilù Tolo as Adriana
 Joachim Fuchsberger as Oberleutnant Heitzel Agen (called "Professor")
 Heinz Reincke as Offizier Hans
 Helmut Schmid as Sergeant Miller
 Otto Stern as Sergeant Braumann
 Pier Luigi Anchisi as Riccio
 Gianni Brezza as Marco
 Duilio Del Prete as Bruno

See also
 Euro War
 War Film

Release
Commandos was released in Italy on 19 November 1968. It was released in West Germany as Himmelfahrtskommando El Alamein in several cities on 8 August 1969.

Reception
In a contemporary review in the Monthly Film Bulletin, Richard Comb commented that the conclusion of the film was "the kind of meaningless apocalyptic moment much favoured when international producers get together to meditate over mutual insanity in war", and that Commandos was "rife with such rhetoric, interspersed with all the action cliches of the war movie and fitfully jerking its line with type"

References

External links

1968 films
1968 war films
North African campaign films
Italian World War II films
German World War II films
Films set in deserts
West German films
Films directed by Armando Crispino
Macaroni Combat films
Films with screenplays by Dario Argento
Films scored by Mario Nascimbene
Films shot in Almería
Films with screenplays by Menahem Golan
1960s Italian films
1960s German films